The Rogue Regional Medical Center (RRMC; formerly Rogue Valley Memorial Hospital, Rogue Valley Medical Center, RVMC) is a regional medical center run by Asante in Medford, Oregon, United States. It was founded in 1958, and currently has 378 beds. It is one of two hospitals in Medford, the other being Providence Medford Medical Center.

History

In the 1950s, the Medford community raised $1.9 million for a new hospital.
On May 1, 1958, the Rogue Valley Memorial Hospital was built for $2.8 million.
It had 80 beds and occupied . It was later renamed Rogue Valley Medical Center, and later became Rogue Regional Medical Center.

The East Wing was added in 1960 for $1.7 million, funded by the Hill–Burton Act, bringing the total number of beds to 160.
Nearly $200,000 more was granted by the act in 1965 for a new diagnostic and treatment center.
A child dental clinic and intensive care, coronary, and cancer units were also added in the 1960s.

In the 1970s, a cardiovascular lab, a linear particle accelerator, an open heart surgery unit, a pediatrics building, and a neonatal intensive care unit (NICU) were added. A child development center opened in the 1980s, along with digital angiography, magnetic resonance imaging (MRI), and alcohol treatment centers.

The new addition on the north side was completed in the 1990s. A library was also built.

A major renovation was completed in 2005. A  six-story inpatient bed tower was also added, including 112 new rooms.

In 2013, Asante Rogue Regional Medical Center was ranked as the top hospital in Oregon for Orthopedic Services, with special mention to the joint replacement program by Healthgrades. RRMC was also recognized as the safest hospital in Oregon by Consumer Reports in its 2013 Hospital Rankings.

In August and September 2021, Asante made headlines when hundreds of their employees demonstrated to protest looming layoffs related to Governor Kate Brown's covid-19 vaccine mandate.

References

Hospital buildings completed in 1958
Hospitals in Oregon
Buildings and structures in Medford, Oregon
Hospitals established in 1958
1958 establishments in Oregon